Jamie Charles "Jay" Bakker (born December 18, 1975) is an American pastor, author, 
and speaker. He is the son of televangelists Jim Bakker and Tammy Faye Messner.

During his young adult years, Bakker became disillusioned with mainstream Christianity, becoming particularly critical of Christian fundamentalism and the Christian right. He later adopted a much more liberal form of Christianity and became a co-founder of Revolution Church, which was created in 1994 in Phoenix, Arizona. Bakker then preached at Revolution's Atlanta location before pastoring the New York City branch of Revolution Church, which held services at the bar and venue Pete's Candy Store, in the Williamsburg section of Brooklyn until Bakker relocated to Minneapolis in 2013 and began pastoring another iteration of Revolution Church there. Much of Bakker's story was retold in a documentary on Sundance Channel called One Punk Under God: The Prodigal Son of Jim and Tammy Faye. His story has also been chronicled in Time Magazine.

Early life
Bakker was born December 18, 1975 in Charlotte, North Carolina to Christian televangelist pastors Jim Bakker and Tammy Faye Bakker (née LaValley).

In 1988 when Bakker was 12 years old, his father Jim was indicted on eight counts of mail fraud, 15 counts of wire fraud and one count of conspiracy and spent six years in federal prison.

The trauma of his father's imprisonment, combined with the subsequent ostracism by others in the Church and religious community, led Bakker to engage in a period of substance abuse and partying during his young adult years.

Political and social views
Bakker has advocated for an open, inclusive Christianity that embraces those with alternative lifestyles and encourages doubt and uncertainty. He has also endorsed gay marriage and has been an advocate for the church's acceptance of the LGBTQ community. He has also questioned traditional interpretations of the atonement and salvation. When asked by Larry King if he was "part of the liberal sect of Christianity," he said that he was "more liberal than most". He also decries the influence of politics in religion, saying that it prevents civil discussion of topics such as homosexuality and abortion. Bakker's church used rainbow-colored communion bread to celebrate the legalization of gay marriage in Minnesota.

Appearances in media
In 2001, Bakker wrote the book Son of a Preacher Man: My Search for Grace in the Shadows which is an autobiography that details his youth, relationship with his parents, the PTL scandals, his anguish at his father's imprisonment, and the founding of Revolution Church.

In 2006, he was featured in the six-part documentary One Punk Under God on the Sundance Channel.

He has appeared on Larry King Live and The Joy Behar Show (August 23, 2011) and has been featured in Rolling Stone, The New York Times, Time, The Economist, FHM and New York Magazine.

In 2011, Bakker and co-author Martin Edlund wrote the book Fall to Grace:  A Revolution of God, Self, and Society.  The book explores the radical, transformative, and inclusive nature of grace, challenges Christians to reassess their understanding of salvation, and encourages non-believers to see Jesus with fresh eyes.

In an episode of American Scandals with Barbara Walters (aired on December 14, 2015, for Investigation Discovery), Bakker was interviewed by Walters about growing up amidst the  intense criticism that followed the fall of his famous father.

See also

 Heritage USA

References

External links

 Commentary about Christianity and politics for CNN 
 Larry King Live on May 29, 2000 
 Larry King Live on January 30, 2001 
 Larry King Live on June 24, 2001 
 Larry King Live on December 15, 2006 

1975 births
Living people
Activists from North Carolina
American Protestant ministers and clergy
American LGBT rights activists
Writers from Charlotte, North Carolina
Christian bloggers